Jeong Jae-won (born 9 June 1969) is a South Korean rower. He competed in the men's coxed four event at the 1988 Summer Olympics. He attended Korea National Sport University. He also competed in the men's coxed four event at the 1989 Summer Universiade.

References

1969 births
Living people
South Korean male rowers
Olympic rowers of South Korea
Rowers at the 1988 Summer Olympics
Place of birth missing (living people)
Korea National Sport University alumni